Andrew "Andy" Rushbury (born 7 March 1983 in Carlisle) is an English  footballer who played as a midfielder in the Football League for Chesterfield. He currently played for Belper Town and is now retired.

Career
Rushbury started his football career as a trainee with Chesterfield in 2000. He made his debut in the 2000–2001 season against Brighton and went on to make two appearances at the end of the 2000–01 campaign, and was given a professional contract in August 2000 and went on to make 40 appearances for Chesterfield scoring 1 goal in the 4–4 draw with Wycombe Wanderers. After spells on loan with Matlock Town he was released by Chesterfield during the 2003–04 season after a loan spell with Alfreton Town making 11 appearances  and joined Conference club Telford United. Telford United then liquidated in 2004. After a brief period at Forest Green Rovers he then went on to play for Belper Town making over 350 appearances for the Derbyshire-based Club.

England Universities
Rushbury also played for his university team at Nottingham Trent University from 2006-2009 and was selected to represent the England university team for the season 2007 and 2008 season selection squad  and was selected to represent the national squad at the world student games.

References

External links
 

1983 births
Living people
Footballers from Carlisle, Cumbria
English footballers
Association football midfielders
Chesterfield F.C. players
Matlock Town F.C. players
Alfreton Town F.C. players
Telford United F.C. players
Forest Green Rovers F.C. players
Belper Town F.C. players
English Football League players
Northern Premier League players
National League (English football) players